Kunkhyen Pema Karpo (1527–1592 CE) was the fourth Gyalwang Drukpa, head of the Drukpa lineage of Tibetan Buddhism. He was the most famous and learned of all the Gyalwang Drukpas. During his lifetime, he was known as the grand lama amongst all grand lamas, and was a teacher to many lamas and disciples all over Tibet. 

Pema Karpo authored twenty-four volumes writing on philosophy, logic, literature, history, and astrology which have since formed a widely studied corpus of work. He is also quite famous for his writings on Mahamudra. He founded Druk Sangag Choeling monastery at Jar in southern Tibet, establishing it as the new seat of the Drukpa lineage.

This omniscient master was the first Gyalwang Drukpa to concoct the famous enlightenment pill known as Ja-Tsukma, utilizing esoteric ingredients offered by the dakinis. Before he died, Pema Karpo promised that he would have two incarnations to propagate the spiritual teachings. In accordance with this prophecy, two incarnations were discovered.

Texts
Practice Guidelines of the Simultaneous School of Mahamudra
The Oral transmission of the Six Cycles of Same Taste: Rolled into a ball [Path walking] instructions
A Casket of Sacred Dharma: Stages of Meditation on Dependent Arising
Commentary on the Bodhicharyavatara

Trivia
The multi-award winning Druk White Lotus School in Shey, Ladakh, is named after him.

Monasteries
Important monasteries of the Drukpa order include:
Ralung Monastery in central Tibet just north of Bhutan
Druk Sangag Choeling Monastery
Hemis Monastery
Thimphu Dzong, which houses the Central Monk Body of Bhutan in summer
Punakha Dzong, the winter home of the Central Monk Body
Namdruk Monastery

References

External links
Drukpa facts and a biography of H.H. the Twelfth Gyalwang Drukpa
The award-winning Druk White Lotus School in Ladakh
Drukpa Publications
Namdruk Institute
Nangchen
H.E. the Ninth Khamtrul Rinpoche Shedrup Nyima b. 1980 (the site is presently under construction)
H.E. the Ninth Khamtrul Rinpoche Jigme Pema Nyinjadh b.1981
The European Centres of Gyalwang Drukpa
Drukpa Trust

Gyalwang Drukpas
Religion in Tibet
1527 births
1592 deaths
Lamas
16th-century Tibetan people
Tibetan philosophers